Roman Efimov (born April 7, 1976) is a Russian orienteering competitor. He is two times Relay World Champion, from 2006 in Aarhus, Denmark, and 2007 in Kyiv, Ukraine, as a member of the Russian winning teams.

His wife Natalia Efimova was a member of Russian national orienteering team.

References

External links
 

1976 births
Living people
Russian orienteers
Male orienteers
Foot orienteers
World Orienteering Championships medalists
21st-century Russian people